Binning is a surname. Notable people with the surname include:

Bob Binning (1935–2005), New Zealand fencer
B. C. Binning (1909–1976), Canadian painter
Hugh Binning (1627–1653), Scottish philosopher and theologian
Jimmy Binning (born 1927), Scottish soccer player
Walter Binning, 16th-century Scottish painter and glazier